The term quantum defect refers to two concepts: energy loss in lasers and energy levels in alkali elements.  Both deal with quantum systems where matter interacts with light.

In laser science
In laser science, the term "quantum defect" refers to the fact that the energy of a pump photon is generally higher than that of a signal photon (photon of the output radiation). The energy difference is lost to heat, which may carry away the excess entropy delivered by the multimode incoherent pump.

The quantum defect of a laser can be defined as part of the energy of the pumping photon, which is lost (not turned into photons at the lasing wavelength) in the gain medium at the lasing. At given frequency  of pump and given frequency  of lasing, the quantum defect . Such quantum defect has dimension of energy; for the efficient operation, the temperature of the gain medium
(measured in units of energy) should be small compared to the quantum defect.

At a fixed pump frequency, the higher the quantum defect, the lower is the upper bound for the power efficiency.

In hydrogenic atoms

The quantum defect of an alkali atom refers to a correction to the energy levels predicted by the classic calculation of the hydrogen wavefunction.  A simple model of the potential experienced by the single valence electron of an alkali atom is that the ionic core acts as a point charge with effective charge e and the wavefunctions are hydrogenic.  However, the structure of the ionic core alters the potential at small radii.

The 1/r potential in the hydrogen atom leads to an electron binding energy given by

For alkali atoms with small orbital angular momentum, the wavefunction of the valence electron is non-negligible in the ion core where the screened Coulomb potential with an effective charge of e no longer describes the potential.  The spectrum is still described well by the Rydberg formula with an angular momentum dependent quantum defect, :

The largest shifts occur when the orbital angular momentum is equal to 0 (normally labeled 's') and these are shown in the table for the alkali metals:

See also
External quantum efficiency
Quantum efficiency of a solar cell

References

Atoms
Laser science